Kathleen Elizabeth Fell (11 January 1921 – 18 January 2009), known professionally as Kathleen Byron, was an English actress.

Early life
Byron was born in Manor Park (then part of Essex) to what she described as "staunch working-class socialists", who later became Labour mayors of the County Borough of East Ham. She attended the local grammar school and trained at the Bristol Old Vic Theatre School. She had her first speaking film role in Carol Reed's The Young Mr. Pitt (1942), in which she had two lines as a maid opposite Robert Donat.

Career

In 1943, Byron married a USAAF pilot, Lt. John Daniel Bowen, and moved to the United States. The director Michael Powell persuaded her to return to Britain where she made her best remembered films. She was cast in several films of the Michael Powell and Emeric Pressburger partnership: as an angel in A Matter of Life and Death (1946), the disturbed Sister Ruth in Black Narcissus (1947, for which she was nominated for Best Actress by the New York Film Critics' Circle) and in The Small Back Room (1949). Byron was romantically linked with Michael Powell for a time; he was named as a co-respondent when her first marriage was dissolved in 1950. Her success in Black Narcissus eventually led her to Hollywood, which resulted in a supporting role in Young Bess (1953). She found the experience an unrewarding one and soon returned to Britain. Her subsequent roles of the time were mostly in B films. She had an occasional role in the 1957–67 soap Emergency Ward 10, playing the alcoholic wife of the consultant gynaecologist Harold de la Roux (John Barron). 

In the 1960s and 1970s, Byron did extensive television work, including a small role as Queen Louise of Denmark in Edward the Seventh (1975), Madame Celeste Lekeu in two episodes of the BBC drama Secret Army (1977), entitled "Bait" and "Good Friday", a brief stint on the soap opera Emmerdale Farm in 1979, and one of the leads in the daytime soap Together (1980-81, its second series broadcast live). Byron continued to act into the new millennium, her film, theatre and television work included Agatha Christie's The Mousetrap (1990), an adaptation of Jane Austen's Emma (1996), Steven Spielberg's Saving Private Ryan (1998), Midsomer Murders (1999) (as Dorothea Pike in S2:E2 “Strangler’s Wood”) and Stephen Poliakoff's series, Perfect Strangers (2001).

Personal life and death
In 1953, Byron married her second husband, the British journalist and writer Alaric Jacob (who predeceased her); Jacob was then working for the BBC. They had one son and daughter; with a child from Jacob's previous marriage.

Byron died on 18 January 2009 at Denville Hall in Northwood, London. She had breast cancer.

Filmography

References

Sources
 McFarlane, Brian. An Autobiography of British Cinema. London: Methuen. 1997;

External links

 
 
 Obituary in The Independent
 Kathleen Byron at the CinéArtistes 
 

1921 births
2009 deaths
English film actresses
English stage actresses
English television actresses
People from East Ham
People from West Ham
Actresses from London
20th-century English actresses
Alumni of Bristol Old Vic Theatre School